As part of the British honours system, Special Honours are issued at the Monarch's pleasure at any given time. The Special Honours refer to the awards made within royal prerogative, operational honours, political honours and other honours awarded outside the New Years Honours and Birthday Honours.

Life Peerage

Conservative Party
 Richard Harrington, to be Baron Harrington of Watford, of Watford in the County of Hertfordshire – 15 March 2022
 Sir Christopher Bellamy, to be Baron Bellamy, of Waddesdon in the County of Buckinghamshire – 14 June 2022
 Nick Markham, to be Baron Markham, of East Horsley in the County of Surrey – 7 October 2022
 Dominic Johnson, to be Baron Johnson of Lainston, of Lainston in the County of Hampshire – 19 October 2022
 Simon Murray, Baron Murray of Blidworth, of Blidworth in the County of Nottinghamshire – 21 October 2022
 The Right Honourable Sir Nicholas Soames, to be Baron Soames of Fletching, of Fletching in the County of East Sussex – 28 October 2022
 Dr. Ruth Lea, to be Baroness Lea of Lymm, of Lymm in the Borough of Warrington in the County of Cheshire – 31 October 2022
 Professor Andrew Roberts, to be Baron Roberts of Belgravia, of Belgravia in the City of Westminster – 1 November 2022
 The Right Honourable Sir Hugo Swire, to be Baron Swire, of Down St Mary in the County of Devon – 1 November 2022
 Sir Michael Hintze, to be Baron Hintze, of Dunster in the County of Somerset – 3 November 2022
 Dr. Sheila Lawlor, to be Baroness Lawlor, of Midsummer Common in the City of Cambridge – 3 November 2022
 Teresa O'Neill, to be Baroness O'Neill of Bexley, of Crook Log in the London Borough of Bexley – 7 November 2022
 Angie Bray, to be Baroness Bray of Coln, of Coln St. Aldwyns in the County of Gloucestershire – 8 November 2022
 Dr. Dambisa Moyo, to be Baroness Moyo, of Knightsbridge in the City of Westminster – 8 November 2022
 Graham Evans, to be Baron Evans of Rainow, of Macclesfield in the County of Cheshire – 9 November 2022
 Stewart Jackson, to be Baron Jackson of Peterborough, of Peterborough in the County of Cambridgeshire – 16 November 2022
 Kate Lampard, to be Baroness Lampard, of Frinsted in the County of Kent – 17 November 2022
 Dr. Cleveland Anthony Sewell, to be Baron Sewell of Sanderstead, of Sanderstead in the County of Surrey – 16 December 2022

Labour Party
 Sharon Taylor, to be Baroness Taylor of Stevenage, of Stevenage in the County of Hertfordshire – 28 October 2022
 Sonny Leong, to be Baron Leong, of Chilton in the County of Oxfordshire and of Camden Town in the London Borough of Camden – 31 October 2022
 Kuldip Singh Sahota, to be Baron Sahota, of Telford in the County of Shropshire – 2 November 2022
 Dr. Fiona Twycross, to be Baroness Twycross, of Headington in the City of Oxford – 7 November 2022
 Ruth Smeeth, to be Baroness Anderson of Stoke-on-Trent, of Stoke-on-Trent in the County of Staffordshire – 18 November 2022
 David Prentis, to be Baron Prentis of Leeds, of Harehills in the City of Leeds – 18 November 2022
 Thomas Watson, to be Baron Watson of Wyre Forest, of Kidderminster in the County of Worcestershire – 21 November 2022
 Frances O'Grady, to be Baroness O'Grady of Upper Holloway, of Wood Farm in the City of Oxford – 9 December 2022

Democratic Unionist Party
 Peter Weir, to be Baron Weir of Ballyholme, of Ballyholme in the County of Down – 16 November 2022

Crossbench
 Shaista Gohir, to be Baroness Gohir, of Hall Green in the City of Birmingham – 28 June 2022
 Professor Katherine Willis, to be Baroness Willis of Summertown, of Summertown in the City of Oxford – 8 July 2022
 Sir Peter Hendy, to be Baron Hendy of Richmond Hill, of Imber in the County of Wiltshire – 17 November 2022
 Air Chief Marshal Sir Stuart Peach, to be Baron Peach, of Grantham in the County of Lincolnshire – 21 November 2022

Non-affiliated
 Professor Guglielmo Verdirame, to be Baron Verdirame, of Belsize Park in the London Borough of Camden – 2 November 2022
 The Right Honourable Dame Arlene Foster, to be Baroness Foster of Aghadrumsee, of Aghadrumsee in the County of Fermanagh – 9 November 2022

Lord Lieutenant 
 Lucy Winskell,  – to be Lord-Lieutenant of Tyne and Wear – 21 February 2022
 Iain Macaulay – to be Lord-Lieutenant for the Western Isles – 8 March 2022
 Lady Emma Barnard – to be Lord-Lieutenant of West Sussex – 23 May 2022
 Susan Lousada – to be Lord-Lieutenant of Bedfordshire – 23 May 2022
 Mohammed Saddiq – to be Lord-Lieutenant of Somerset – 1 August 2022
 Beatrice Grant – to be Lord-Lieutenant of Worcestershire – 15 December 2022

Most Ancient and Most Noble Order of the Thistle

Lady of the Order of the Thistle (LT)
 The Right Honourable Dame Elish Angiolini,  – 10 June 2022

Knight of the Order of the Thistle (KT)
 The Right Honourable Sir George Reid,  – 10 June 2022

Privy Counsellor 
 Chris Heaton-Harris  – 16 February 2022
 The Right Honourable The Baroness Williams of Trafford – 3 March 2022
 Elin Jones  – 16 March 2022
 Alison Johnstone  – 16 March 2022
 The Honourable Lord Doherty  – 13 April 2022
 The Honourable Lady Wise  – 13 April 2022
 The Honourable Lord Tyre  – 13 April 2022
 Shailesh Vara  – 8 July 2022.
 Andrew Stephenson  – 8 July 2022.
 The Honourable Lord Matthews  – 19 July 2022.
 Johnny Mercer  – 19 July 2022.
 Sir Clive Alderton  – 13 September 2022.
 Kemi Badenoch  – 13 September 2022.
 Ranil Jayawardena  – 13 September 2022.
 Wendy Morton  – 13 September 2022.
 The Right Honourable The Lord True  – 13 September 2022.
 Chloe Smith  – 13 September 2022.
 Edward Argar  – 13 September 2022.
 Simon Case  – 13 September 2022.
 Vicky Ford  – 13 September 2022.
 James Heappey  – 13 September 2022.
 Stephen McPartland  – 13 September 2022.
 Chris Philp  – 13 September 2022.
 Graham Stuart  – 13 September 2022.
 Tom Tugendhat  – 13 September 2022.
 The Honourable Sir Thomas Mark Horner  – 19 October 2022.
 David TC Davies  – 27 October 2022.
 Gillian Keegan  – 27 October 2022.
 John Glen  – 27 October 2022.
 The Honourable Victoria Prentis  – 27 October 2022.
 Jeremy Quin  – 27 October 2022.
 Rachel Reeves  – 1 November 2022.
 The Right Honourable The Lord Kennedy of Southwark – 1 November 2022.
 The Honourable Dame Sarah Falk  – 14 December 2022.

Knight Bachelor

 The Right Honourable Gavin Williamson,  – 3 March 2022
 The Honourable Mr. Justice Charles Gregory Bourne,  – 16 March 2022
 The Honourable Mr. Justice Neil Richard Calver,  – 16 March 2022
 The Honourable Mr. Justice Barry Paul Cotter,  – 16 March 2022
 The Honourable Mr. Justice Stephen John Arthur Eyre,  – 16 March 2022
 The Honourable Mr. Justice Michael John Fordham,  – 16 March 2022
 The Honourable Mr. Justice David Andrew Foxton,  – 16 March 2022
 The Honourable Mr. Justice Michael Anthony Green,  – 16 March 2022
 The Honourable Mr. Justice Andrew Raywod Henshaw,  – 16 March 2022
 The Honourable Mr. Justice Nicholas Richard Maybury Hilliard,  – 16 March 2022
 The Honourable Mr. Justice Michael Robert Humphreys,  – 16 March 2022
 The Honourable Mr. Justice Adam Martin Johnson,  – 16 March 2022
 The Honourable Mr. Justice Edwin Geoffrey Johnson,  – 16 March 2022
 The Honourable Mr. Justice Thomas Alexander Crispin Leech,  – 16 March 2022
 The Honourable Mr. Justice Thomas Dominic Linden,  – 16 March 2022
 The Honourable Mr. Justice David Kennedy McFarland,  – 16 March 2022
 The Honourable Mr. Justice Edward James Mellor,  – 16 March 2022
 The Honourable Mr. Justice Robert John Miles,  – 16 March 2022
 The Honourable Mr. Justice Robert Roger Peel,  – 16 March 2022
 The Honourable Mr. Justice Nigel David Poole,  – 16 March 2022
 The Honourable Mr. Justice Andrew George Ritchie,  – 16 March 2022
 The Honourable Mr. Justice Kevin James Rooney,  – 16 March 2022
 The Honourable Mr. Justice David Alister Scoffield,  – 16 March 2022
 The Honourable Mr. Justice Mark Arthur Wall,  – 16 March 2022
 The Right Honourable Jake Berry,  – 15 October 2022 – Member of Parliament for Rossendale and Darwen, Minister without Portfolio and Chairman of the Conservative Party, former Minister of State for the Northern Powerhouse and Local Growth.  For political and public service to the North of England.
 The Right Honourable John Whittingdale,  – 15 October 2022 – Member of Parliament for Maldon, former Secretary of State for Culture, Media and Sport. For political and public service.

Most Honourable Order of the Bath

Knight Grand Cross of the Order of the Bath (GCB) 
Honorary
 His Excellency Cyril Ramaphosa – President of South Africa – 22 November 2022

Order of Merit
Six new members of the order were chosen by Elizabeth II shortly before her death. The appointments were formally made by Charles III two months later.

 Sir David Adjaye,  – 11 November 2022
 Professor Dame Elizabeth Anionwu,  – 11 November 2022
 The Right Honourable The Baroness Benjamin,  – 11 November 2022
 Professor Margaret MacMillan,  (Canadian) – 11 November 2022
 Sir Paul Nurse,  – 11 November 2022
 Venki Ramakrishnan – 11 November 2022

Most Distinguished Order of St Michael and St George

Knight / Dame Grand Cross of the Order of St Michael and St George (GCMG) 
 Her Excellency Froyla Tzalam – On her appointment as Governor-General of Belize – 18 March 2022
 His Excellency The Reverend Tofiga Vaevalu Falani, Governor-General of Tuvalu – 18 September 2022

Knight Commander of the Order of St Michael and St George (KCMG) 
 James Duddridge,  – 15 October 2022 – Member of Parliament Rochford and Southend East, Minister of State for International Trade; former Parliamentary Under-Secretary of State for Africa, for DEXEU, Lord Commissioner of HM Treasury, and Parliamentary Private Secretary to the Prime Minister. For political and public service.

Honorary
 His Excellency Khaled Al-Duwaisan,  – 19 July 2022 – upon relinquishing his appointment as Ambassador from the State of Kuwait to the Court of St James's and upon retiring as Dean of the Diplomatic Corps

Companion of the Order of St Michael and St George (CMG) 
 Theodor Meron,  – 8 March 2022 – Honorary appointed in 2019 to be made Substantive

Honorary
 Gonzalo Muñoz Abogabir – High-Level Champion for the United Nations Climate Change Conference of the Parties. For services to tackling climate change and supporting the UK Presidency of the 2021 UN Climate Change Conference.

Royal Victorian Order

Knight Commander of the Royal Victorian Order (KCVO) 
 Admiral Sir James Francis Perowne,  – on relinquishment of the appointment of Constable and Governor, Windsor Castle – 19 July 2022

Commander of the Royal Victorian Order (CVO) 
 Rear Admiral James Macleod,  – upon relinquishing his appointment as Defence Services Secretary – 16 February 2022
 Melissa Sarah Morris,  – on relinquishment of the appointment of Secretary, Lord Chamberlain's Office – 22 June 2022
 The Reverend Canon Jonathan Byam Valentine Riviere,  – on relinquishment of the appointment of Domestic Chaplain at Sandringham – 5 July 2022

Lieutenant of the Royal Victorian Order (LVO) 
 Rachel Ann Jane Gordon,  – on relinquishment of the appointment of Housekeeper, Windsor Castle – 31 March 2022
 Thomas Robert Laing-Baker – on relinquishment of the appointment of Assistant Private Secretary to The Queen – 27 April 2022
 Donal Valentine McCabe – on relinquishment of the appointment of Communications Secretary to the Queen – 6 September 2022

Member of the Royal Victorian Order (MVO) 
 Captain Sure Limbu, Gurkha Staff and Personnel Support – 14 July 2022
 Captain Krishnapresad Loksam, The Royal Gurkha Rifles – 14 July 2022
 Lieutenant Colonel Thomas Garry White – on relinquishment of the appointment as Equerry to Her Late Majesty The Queen – 19 October 2022

Honorary
 Robert Large,  – lately Yeoman of the Royal Cellars – 17 July 2022

Most Excellent Order of the British Empire

Knight / Dame Commander of the Order of the British Empire (KBE / DBE) 
Civil division
 Caroline Dinenage,  – 31 December 2021 – Member of Parliament for Gosport, formerly Minister of State for Digital and Culture. For public and political service.
 The Right Honourable Robert Buckland,  – 31 December 2021 – Member of Parliament for South Swindon, formerly Lord Chancellor and Secretary of State for Justice. For public and political service.
 The Honourable Mrs. Justice Emma Louise Arbuthnot, The Lady Arbuthnot of Edrom,  – 16 March 2022
 The Honourable Mrs. Justice Kelyn Meher Bacon,  – 16 March 2022
 The Honourable Mrs. Justice Rowena Collins Rice,  – 16 March 2022
 The Honourable Mrs. Justice Naomi Lisa Ellenbogen,  – 16 March 2022
 The Honourable Mrs. Justice Joanna Angela Smith,  – 16 March 2022
 The Honourable Mrs. Justice Mary Elizabeth Stacey,  – 16 March 2022
 The Honourable Mrs. Justice Amanda Jane Tipples,  – 16 March 2022
 The Honourable Mrs. Justice Heather Jean Williams,  – 16 March 2022
 Deborah James – 12 May 2022

Honorary
 Christiana Figueres – International Climate Leader. For services to International Leadership on Global Climate Change.
 John Williams – Composer and Conductor. For Services to Film Music.
 Bob Iger – Former Chairman & Chief Executive Officer, Disney Company. For Services to the UK/US Relations.

Commander of the Order of the British Empire (CBE) 
Civil division
Honorary
 Ben Barkow – Former Chief Executive, Wiener Holocaust Library. For Services to Holocaust Education and Remembrance.
 Rafael del Pino Calvo-Sotelo – Chairman, Ferrovial. For services to the UK transport and infrastructure sectors.
 Ken Hom,  – Chef and Author. For services to charity, culinary arts and education.
 Dr. Susan Hopkins – Healthcare Epidemiologist Consultant in Infectious Diseases and Microbiology at Public Health England. For services to Public Health.
 Ali Koç – 	Vice-Chair of Board, Koç Holdings. For services to Trade and Investment between Britain and Turkey.
 Ajay Piramal – India Co-Chair UK-India CEO Forum. For services to the UK-India trade relationship.
 Professor Cheng-Hock Toh – Lately President, British Society for Haematology and Academic Vice-President, Royal College of Physicians. For services to haematology and medicine.
 Sarina Wiegman – England Women’s National Football Coach. For services to Association football.

Military division
 Brigadier Daniel Blanchford, Royal Marines
 Air Commodore Simon Robert Strasdin,  Royal Air Force
 Commodore (now Rear Admiral) Stephen Mark Richard Moorhouse, OBE, Royal Navy

Officer of the Order of the British Empire (OBE) 
Civil division
 Ronan Lyons,  – 5 January 2022 – Honorary appointed in 2021 to be made Substantive

Honorary
 Frans Caljé – Chief Executive Officer, PD Ports. For services to International Trade.
 Phaedon Christopoulos – Managing Director of CPPC Logistics, Sovereign Base Area Cyprus. For services to British Forces Cyprus and the Sovereign Base Area Administration.
 Professor Keith Humphreys – Esther Ting Memorial Professor of Psychiatry & Behavioural Sciences, Stanford University. For services to UK-US Relations.
 George Holding – Congressman, US House of Representatives. For services to Science and Policy on Addiction.
 Kishore Jayaraman – President Rolls-Royce India and South Asia. For services to International Trade and Investment.
 Dr. Vinod Joshi – Retired dentist and founder of the Mouth Cancer Foundation in the UK. Retired dentist and founder of the Mouth Cancer Foundation in the UK.
 Bear Montique – Interim Chief Executive Officer, Standing Together Against Domestic Violence and Founder, Advance Advocacy Service. For services to the prevention of violence against women and girls.
 Neil Peck – Former Attorney and Honorary Consul. For services to UK-Colorado relations.
 Patricia Mawuli Porter – Co-founder and Pilot, Aviation and Technology Academy Ghana. For services to Aviation.
 Roisin Quinn – Senior Manager, National Grid. For services to the Electricity System, Energy Security and Decarbonisation.
 Professor Paula Reimer – Director, CHRONO Centre for Climate, Environment and Chronology, Queen’s University Belfast. For Services to Radiocarbon Dating, Calibration and Chronology.
 Dorothea Ruland – Secretary General, German Academic Exchange Service. For services to the British/German relationship.
 Darren Walker – President Ford Foundation. For Services to UK/US Relations.
 Susan Whelan – Chief Executive, Leicester City Football Club. For services to Football, the economy in the East Midlands and the wider community in Leicester.

Military division
 Lieutenant Colonel David Christopher Middleton, The Parachute Regiment
 Lieutenant Colonel Thomas Rupert Mark Robinson, The Light Dragoons
 Wing Commander Thomas Leslie Stevenson, Royal Air Force
 Commander Claire Fiona Thompson, Royal Navy
 Lieutenant Colonel William James Meddings, The Royal Anglian Regiment

Member of the Order of the British Empire (MBE) 
Civil division
 Brigitte Zelie Squire-Dehouch,  – 5 January 2022 – Honorary appointed in 2010 to be made Substantive
 Ann Hutchinson Guest,  – 8 March 2022 – Honorary appointed in 2021 to be made Substantive
 Diala Khlat,  – 5 January 2022 – Honorary appointed in 2021 to be made Substantive

Honorary
 Dr. Shehlina Ahmed – Health Adviser. 	For services to health in Bangladesh.
 Marwan Al-Jarah – Counter-Terrorism Programme Support Officer. For services to National Security and human rights.
 Jan Bartu – Performance Director, Modern Pentathlon. For services to Modern Pentathlon.
 Manog Bissoondutt – Humane Society Manager, British Virgin Islands. For services to animal welfare within the British Virgin Islands.
 Cindi Black – Owner and Director, Great Western pre-school, Aberdeenshire. For services to Pre-School Education in Aberdeen.
 Roberto Castiglioni – Disability Rights campaigner. For services to Aviation Accessibility.
 Marcela Černochová – Managing Director, British Chamber of Commerce. For services to British business in the Czech Republic.
 Barbara Chantrill – Founder, Leicestershire Education Business Company. For services to Education.
 Professor Daniel Charny – Designer. For services to Design and Creativity.
 Dr. Margaret Coffey – Clinical Service Lead (ENT/Head & Neck), Imperial College Healthcare NHS Trust. For services to Speech and Language Therapy.
 Philippe Corréa – Director of Industrial Relations at the French Alternative Energies and Atomic Energy Com-mission. For services to UK and France Nuclear co-operation.
 Professor Daniela De Angelis – Professor of Statistical Science for Health, University of Cambridge.  Science for Health, University of Cambridge	For services to Medical Research and Public Health.
 Dónal Doherty – Conductor Codetta Choir. For services to Music in Northern Ireland.
 Major (Rtd) Brian Duffy – Chairman, Royal British Legion, Republic of Ireland Branch. Chairman, Royal British Legion, Republic of Ireland Branch.
 Pierre Gomez – Data Supervisor Medical Research Council Unit, The Gambia. For services to Medical Research in The Gambia.
 Akira Haseyama – Former President of Keio University. For services to the British Olympic and Paralympic Teams.
 Fumiko Hayashi – Former Mayor of Yokohama. For services to the British Olympic and Paralympic Teams.
 Verena Katharina Hefti – Founder, Leaders Plus. 	For services to Equality.
 Roberto Herrera Pablo – Country Manager and Board Member of InterEnergy Group. For services to Sustainable and Clean Energy.
 Dr. Shafie Kamaruddin – Deputy Medical Director, County Durham and Darlington NHS Foundation Trust. For services to the NHS.
 Alena Krajtlova – Training Wing Assistant. For services to UK International Defence engagement Programmes.
 Guruswamy Krishnamoorthy – Chief Executive Officer, Penlon. For services to the Ventilator Challenge.
 Dr. Mikael Mikaelsson – Science and Innovation Officer, British Embassy Stockholm. For services to International collaboration on Climate Change.
 Sinéad Murphy – Founder and CCO Shnuggle. For services to Trade and the Economy in Northern Ireland.
 Daisy Narayanan – Lately Director of Urbanism, Sustrans. For services to Inclusive Urban Planning.
 Miriam Purves – Nurse, Western Health and Social Care Trust. For services to Nursing during COVID-19.
 Arevik Saribekyan – Country Director, British Council in Armenia. For services to UK/Armenia Cultural Relations.
 Elizabeth Schlachter – Former Executive Director Family Planning 2020. Former Executive Director Family Planning 2020.
 Yasuhisa Shiozaki – Former Co-Chair of UK-Japan 21st Century Group. For services to UK/Japan relations.
 Yau Kong Tham – Military historian, Malaysian conservationist and tour guide in Sabah, Malaysia. For services to Environmental, Historical and Cultural Conservation.
 Takashi Tsukamoto – Chair, The Japan-British Society. For services to UK/Japan relations.
 Muhidin Tutic – Protocol and Visits Officer, EU Force HQ, Sarajevo. For services to UK operations and observed acts of remembrance in Bosnia and Herzegovina.
 Mary Vine-Morris – Area Director, Association of Colleges, London. For services to Further Education.
 Ronald Claus Julian Weber – Victims Commissioner of the State of Berlin. For services to UK/German relations.

Military division
 Major Stephen Geoffrey White, The Parachute Regiment
 Warrant Officer Class 2 Daniel James Bryceland, Corps of Royal Engineers
 Warrant Officer Class 2 Thomas Anthony Whitehead, Intelligence Corps
 Chief Petty Officer Logistician (Supply Chain) Laura Perry, Royal Navy
 Warrant Officer Class 1 Engineering Technician (Marine Engineering) Clint Wheeler, Royal Navy
 Major Benjamin Sean Costello Attrell, Corps of Royal Engineers
 Major Steven John Howard, Army Air Corps
 Squadron Leader Jonathan Jack Eddison, Royal Air Force
 Flight Lieutenant Victoria Grace Kellagher, Royal Air Force

British Empire Medal (BEM) 

Honorary
 Joan Bruton – Retired Founder of Light House Trust Summer School. For services to the Disabled Community in Ireland.
 Bruna Cerqueira – Senior Climate Adviser, British Embassy Brasilia. For services to UK interests in Brazil.
 Brian Coleman – Founder, Two Touch project. 	For services to Exercise and Well-being for Cardiac patients.
 Astrid Gillespie – Leader and Volunteer, Friends of All Saints Church Volunteer Group, East Horndon. For services to Community Heritage.
 Isabelle Gouget – Occupational therapist, Oxford NHS Foundation Trust. For services to Occupational Therapy during Covid-19.
 Daniela Anna Jenkins – Executive Director, Charlbury Community Centre. For services to the community in Charlbury, Oxfordshire.
 Paresh Jethwa – Co-Founder Community Response Kitchen. FFor services to the community in the London Borough of Hendon during COVID-19.
 Reshmi Kalam – Community and NHS volunteer. For services to community in Maidstone, Kent during COVID-19.
 Sotiris Katsimpas – IT Manager, The Edinburgh Remakery. For services to Third Sector Charity during COVID-19.
 Tarsem Kaur – Community volunteer. For services to the Community in Handsworth, Birmingham particularly during COVID-19.
 Ronald Loof – President, Risquons Tous World War 2 Memorial Association. For services to the remembrance of British Soldiers who died in Mouscron in 1940.
 Alan Mulligan – District Treasurer for the Royal British Legion, Republic of Ireland. For services to the Royal British Legion.
 Thi Bich Ngan Nguyen – Corporate Services Manager, British Embassy Vietnam. For services to UK/Vietnam relations.
 Abraham Heinrich Wermuth – Volunteer. 	For services to Holocaust education and awareness.
 Kabura Zakama – North-East Regional Coordinator, British High Commission Abuja. For services to the UK in Nigeria.

Air Force Cross (AFC) 

 Wing Commander Kevin Harry Thomas Latchman, Royal Air Force
 Flight Lieutenant Edward Bindloss Gibb, Royal Air Force

Royal Victorian Medal (RVM) 

Silver
 Clive Dalton Jones – Verger, the Royal Chapel, Windsor Great Park – 2 June 2022

Mentioned in Despatches 

 Private Ahmad Fahim, The Parachute Regiment
 Corporal Daniel Matthew Hoyland, The Parachute Regiment
 Sergeant Adam James Humphreys, 1st The Queen’s Dragoon Guards

Queen's Commendation for Bravery 

 Private Lewis Bradley O’Connor, The Parachute Regiment
 Chief Petty Officer Jamie Andrew Ward, Royal Navy
 Captain Lucy Elizabeth Russell, The Royal Logistic Corps
 Lance Corporal (now Retired) Fraser Alan Duncan Gee, Royal Tank Regiment

Queen's Commendation for Valuable Service 

 Lieutenant Commander Andrew Dennis, Royal Navy
 Lieutenant Commander William John Durbin, Royal Navy
 Corporal Jamie Lee Found, The Parachute Regiment
 Lieutenant Colonel William Thomas Hindle Hunt, The Parachute Regiment
 Lieutenant Colonel Chloe O’Brien, The Royal Logistic Corps
 Staff Sergeant Andrea Pearson, The Royal Logistic Corps
 Captain James Nicholas Robson, The Parachute Regiment
 Captain Helene Lucie Gleizes, Intelligence Corps
 Major Hugo Peter Henderson, Royal Army Medical Corps
 Petty Officer Warfare Specialist (Electronic Warfare) Timothy Stephen Dodge, Royal Navy
 Lieutenant Commander Alexandra Katherine Harris, Royal Navy
 Leading Warfare Specialist (Underwater Warfare) Jake Ryan Hobday, Royal Navy
 Warrant Officer Class 1 Engineering Technician (Communications and Information Systems) Christopher Robbins, Royal Navy
 Staff Sergeant (now Warrant Officer Class 2) Meghann Kylie Bradbury, Queen Alexandra’s Royal Army Nursing Corps
 Captain Andrew Robert MacBeth, Royal Tank Regiment
 Corporal (now Acting Sergeant) Toyah Louise Palmer, Intelligence Corps
 Captain Helena Katheryn Richardson, Royal Regiment of Artillery
 Acting Warrant Officer Kevin Edward Jones, Royal Air Force
 Flight Lieutenant Graeme John Ritchie, Royal Air Force
 Acting Corporal Stefan Cole, Royal Army Medical Corps

Order of St John

Dame Grand Cross of the Order of St John (GCStJ) 
 Her Royal Highness The Countess of Wessex,

Knight of the Order of St John (KStJ) 
 Thomas Budd
 Findlay MacRae
 Lieutenant Colonel David Twigg, MBE

Dame of the Order of St John (DStJ) 
 Margaret Suckling
 Jane Swainson

Commander of the Order of St John (CStJ) 
 Professor Peter Kurrild-Klitgaard
 Deborah Lewis
 James Saunders Watson
 Lynn Cleal
 Florence Dewar
 William Hackett
 Vivienne Robertson
 The Right Reverend Gregory Cameron
 Simon Cole
 Dr. Bryan Craig Ellis
 Colonel (Ret’d) Stephen Franklin
 Raymond Grant Hirst
 Richard Hitchcock

Officer of the Order of St John (OStJ) 
 Brigadier Stephen Archer, ARRC, QHN
 Carol Calvert
 Surgeon Captain Rikus Coetzee, RN
 Jason Peter Eldridge
 Keith Horsman
 Pamela King
 David Lewis, MBE, JP
 Wendy-Lee McCormick
 Christopher Phillips
 Jean Slater, BEM
 Ian Wand
 Jonathan Whitker, JP
 Jess Duncan
 David Gibb
 Graham Smith
 Kenneth Webster
 Richard Baxter
 Judith Goldsmith
 Andrew King
 Stephen More
 Tracy Sankey-Jones
 Helen Smith
 Claire Stone
 Ada Rheeder
 Yusuf Steytler

References 

2022 awards in the United Kingdom
New Zealand awards
2022 awards in Canada
British honours system